Andrew Harris (born 17 November 1970) is an English former professional footballer who made 40 appearances in the Football League playing for Birmingham City, Oxford United and Exeter City. He played as a midfielder.

Life and career
Harris was born in Birmingham. He joined Birmingham City as an apprentice under the YTS scheme, and turned professional two years later. He made his debut on 11 November 1989, substituting for John Frain in a goalless draw at Leyton Orient in the Football League Third Division. In March 1990, he signed on loan for Telford United, and scored once from six appearances in the Football Conference. He went on loan in October 1991 to Oxford United of the Second Division, where he played only once, and the following month was allowed to move to Exeter City. In two-and-a-half years at Exeter Harris played 38 games in the third tier, scoring one league goal, which came against Stoke City.

In April 1994, he moved into non-league football with Nuneaton Borough of the Southern League Premier Division. He played twice that season, and was a regular in 1994–95, scoring three goals from 31 Southern League Midland Division matches, before moving on to another Midland Division club, Corby Town, ahead of the 1995–96 season. He joined Midland Alliance team Hinckley Athletic in November 1995, but only played twice before returning to the Southern League Midland Division and moving nearer home to Solihull Borough. He rejoined Hinckley Athletic late in 1996, but a knee injury disrupted his return.

In July 1998, Peter Frain was appointed manager of Knowle Town with Harris as his assistant and player. He left for Paget Rangers of the Southern League Western Division at the end of the season.

References

1970 births
Living people
Footballers from Birmingham, West Midlands
English footballers
Association football midfielders
Birmingham City F.C. players
Telford United F.C. players
Oxford United F.C. players
Exeter City F.C. players
Nuneaton Borough F.C. players
Corby Town F.C. players
Hinckley Athletic F.C. players
Solihull Borough F.C. players
English Football League players
National League (English football) players
Southern Football League players